The 2015 Firestone 600 was the ninth round of the 2015 IndyCar Series season. It took take place on Saturday, June 6. The race was contested over 248 laps at the  Texas Motor Speedway in Fort Worth, Texas, and was televised by NBCSN in the United States. It marked the 27th IndyCar race held at the speedway since it was first held there in 1997.

Background 
The second race in last week's rounds 7 and 8 in the IndyCar series marked the first time all season that a race finished without a Penske or Ganassi driver among the top two places. The top performance by either of the super teams was a third-place showing by Penske’s Simon Pagenaud in first race of the dual in Detroit on Saturday. It also marked the best showing by Honda cars with the manufacturer taking 1-2 in the first race, and 2-3 in the second race.

Report

Qualifying 
Initial practice and qualifying took place in the afternoon on Friday June 5, 2015 with a final practice occurring later that evening.

Race summary 
The race took place on the evening of Saturday June 6, 2015 and was the fastest IndyCar Series race ever run at the Texas Motor Speedway with an average speed of 191.940 mph. It was a relative clean contest with only one caution occurring between laps 84 to 96, which was due to non-contact debris on the front stretch of the track, during the entire 248 lap race. Pole driver Will Power had the lead for the first 7 laps of the race, when Simon Pagenaud took the lead from him and held it for the next 59 laps of the race. Multiple pit stops by others further back in the field to make wing and tire adjustments shuffled the order and put several drivers one to three laps down. Finding the right balance of downforce and tire wear and press would prove pivotal in the race. In lap 67, Tony Kanaan took the lead. During the caution beginning in lap 84, pretty much the entire field pitted, and pit times resulted in a major reshuffling of order once again with Juan Pablo Montoya holding the lead when the race resumed on lap 96, with Kanaan retaking the lead on lap 103.

As cars pitted for fuel beginning in lap 138, the lead was again reshuffled, with the lead passing to Scott Dixon, Hélio Castroneves, James Jakes and then back to Dixon. Another round of pitting for fuel again reshuffled the lead over a ten lap period, with Kanaan, then Castroneves and then Marco Andretti taking the lead. Dixon re-took the lead on lap 194 and would maintain lead for the rest of the race with the except of his taking his final pit stop for fuel on lap 228 end up having the lead for a total of 97 laps, eclipsing his season total of 59 in laps led in one race. He would go on to win the race, which his Chip Ganassi Racing teammate Kanaan taking second, and Castroneves taking the third podium position for Team Penske. The top 4 finishers were all Chevrolet cars which dominated the race and the top finishers suggest high downforce will be the way to success on oval courses for the remainder of the season.

Race results

Championship standings after the race 

Drivers' standings

 Note: Only the top five positions are included.

References

External links

2015 in IndyCar
2015 in sports in Texas
2015 Firestone 600
Firestone 600